The 2001 season was Molde's 26th season in the top flight of Norwegian football. In Tippeligaen they finished in 5th position.

Molde participated in the Norwegian Cup. On 25 July 2001, Molde was defeated 2-3 at away ground by Bryne in the fourth round.

Squad

As of end of season.

Pre-season

Friendlies

Competitions

Tippeligaen

Results summary

Results by round

Results

League table

Norwegian Cup

Squad statistics

Appearances and goals

                                 

        
|-
|colspan="14"|Players away from Molde on loan:
|-
|colspan="14"|Players who left Molde during the season:
      

|}

Goal Scorers

See also
Molde FK seasons

References

External links
nifs.no

2001
Molde